Mesorhizobium temperatum is a gram-negative, aerobic, non-spore-forming bacterium from the genus Mesorhizobium which was isolated from Astragalus adsurgens which were found in northern regions of China.

References

External links
Type strain of Mesorhizobium temperatum at BacDive -  the Bacterial Diversity Metadatabase

Phyllobacteriaceae
Bacteria described in 2004